The eastern woolly lemur (Avahi laniger), also known as the eastern avahi or Gmelin's woolly lemur, is a species of woolly lemur native to eastern Madagascar, where it lives in the wet tropical rainforest at low elevations along the eastern coast of the island or they can also inhabit the northern tip of the island with other species. The woolly lemur name refers to their thick, tightly curled hair, whereas their generic name avahi refers to their high-pitched defensive call. The eastern woolly lemur almost has an owl-look with its large eyes, small rounded head, and ears that are mostly hidden. Its diet consists mainly of leaves and buds with fruits, flowers, and bark.

Eastern woolly lemurs live in monogamous pairs together with their offspring. The eastern woolly lemur's breeding season ranges from March to May with the baby lemurs being born around August to September.

Other lemur species that live in the same rainforests as eastern woolly lemur are the diademed sifaka (Propithecus diadema) and the red-bellied lemur (Eulemur rubriventer). In southeastern rainforests, sympatric lemur species of A. meridionalis are the brown mouse lemur (Microcebus rufus), the greater dwarf lemur (Cheirogaleus major), the fat-tailed dwarf lemur (Cheirogaleus medius) and the collared brown lemur (Eulemur collaris) in Sainte Luce Forest, and the southern lesser bamboo lemur (Hapalemur meridionalis) in Mandena Forest.

According to one study, a male lemur rarely interacts with more than one other individual when sleeping, traveling or grooming. At night, he would spend about 40% of the time with his partner either grooming or resting.

, the eastern woolly Llemur continues to exist; however, based on a 2000 study, the entire lemur population might be endangered if the forests continues to "disappear at a disastrous rate". This could be due to many reasons, for example deforestation and forest degradation.

References

Woolly lemurs
Mammals described in 1788
Taxa named by Johann Friedrich Gmelin
Fauna of the Madagascar lowland forests